"Ode to Sleep" is a song by American musical duo Twenty One Pilots. The song was recorded by the band for their second studio album, Regional at Best, and upon partnering with Fueled by Ramen re-recorded the song for their third studio album Vessel.

Background 

Regarding the creation of the song, Joseph states that he did not know "exactly how it happened" or "what he was thinking about", but was satisfied with the final result. One of his favorite songs to bring on stage, he defines Ode to Sleep "a puzzle because of its particular structure and how it accidentally manages to be together".

In regard to the song title, Tyler Joseph said:

Veteran member Chris Salih said that they "played [Ode to Sleep] to have that song named," during a time in which the band was without a label and they could perform new songs when they wanted to. The song was first performed on October 1, 2010, at the Newport Music Hall, roughly eight months before the release of the sophomore album Regional at Best. Salih said three jars were placed on the band's merchandise table where concertgoers could vote on the song's name. The names were pre-chosen by the band, but the band members have since forgotten the other two names.  

Joseph has also said:

Production 
The song was written by Tyler Joseph and produced by Twenty One Pilots for Regional at Best.

After teaming up with Fueled by Ramen and a production staff of higher caliber, Greg Wells helped produce the version to appear on Vessel. Like the rest of the album, it was recorded at the Rocket Carousel Studio in Los Angeles, California.

Release 
"Ode to Sleep" originally appears on the Twenty One Pilots album Regional at Best. Next it makes an appearance on Twenty One Pilots' Three Songs EP alongside Regional at Best song "Guns for Hands" and "Migraine". In 2017, all three tracks were certified gold by the RIAA and over 500,000 copies were sold individually.

It was then re-recorded on account of Twenty One Pilots teaming up with Fueled by Ramen and placed on Twenty One Pilots' third album Vessel.

During the "Quiet is Violent Tour," a brief poem entitled "Only Skeleton Bones Remain" would precede the performance of this song.

Critical reception 
Dan LeRoy of Alternative Press deems the song Twenty One Pilots' best, stating that "If one single track best incorporates all the elements that have made Twenty One Pilots beloved, 'Ode to Sleep' would be it. A manic, tempo-shifting mashup of hip-hop swagger and indie-rock doubt, with a heart-stopping pop chorus designed to drive demons away."

Mitch Mosk of Atwood Magazine compared the song's pre-chorus to Electric Light Orchestra's "Mr. Blue Sky." According to Mosk, the song's beginning is primarily electronic with rapping similar to Eminem, whereas the song has a "full-blown indie-pop chorus, with jingling piano keys and rock drums."  Ultimately, he attributes the appeal of the song to the (genre-swapping) disparity of the "impressive rapping" and "anthemic pop chorus' emotional release."

Music video 
On December 31st, 2014, the band released a music video for the song "Ode to Sleep". Composed of footage captured by the band's creative director Mark C. Eshleman of Reel Bear Media from three concerts from the past three years, the video depicted the band's rapid growth from their origins as a small local band to a nationally-popular alternative act, an upward trend that would continue into the next album cycle. Eshleman then went on to direct the music video, along with most of the band's others from 2012 to 2015, and again in 2019.

It was revealed that a skeptical Eshleman had pulled Joseph aside a few times before the shooting at the empty venue, questioning whether the small crowd was even worth filming. Joseph insisted and the music video has since garnered over 20 million views.

Personnel 

 Tyler Joseph – vocals, guitar, bass, keyboard, synthesizer, programming
 Josh Dun – drums, percussion

Other musicians 
 Greg Wells – keyboard, synthesizer, programming

Certifications

References 

2011 songs
2012 singles
2013 songs
Twenty One Pilots songs
Songs written by Tyler Joseph